Marilyn Avila (born January 3, 1949) is a former Republican member of the North Carolina House of Representatives. She first won office in the 2006 election, and she represented the state's 40th house district from 2007 until 2017. She was defeated by Democrat Joe John in the 2016 election. In 2018, she attempted to make a comeback for her old seat, but she lost again to John. She chaired the Appropriations Subcommittee on Health and Human Services, Commerce and Job Development Subcommittee on Science and Technology, Unemployment Fraud Task Force. Rep. Avila also sat on the Appropriations Committee, Appropriations Subcommittee on Education, Commerce and Job Development Committee, Education Committee, Ethics Committee, House Select Committee on Certificate of Need Process and Related Hospital Issues, House Select Committee on Education Reform, House Select Committee on State-Owned Assets, State Personnel Committee, and Transportation Committee.

Her professional career includes working as a chemist for HanesBrands, Inc., for the public policy think tank John Locke Foundation and hairstyling salon owner.

Election results

2018 General Election

2016 General Election

2014 General Election

2012 General Election

2010 General Election

2008 General Election

2006 General Election

2006 Primary Election

References

External links

Republican Party members of the North Carolina House of Representatives
Women state legislators in North Carolina
Living people
1949 births
21st-century American politicians
21st-century American women politicians